Mi Buenos Aires querido is a 1936  Argentine musical film directed and written by Julio Irigoyen. It is a tango film.

The soundtrack of the movie features the tango "Mi Buenos Aires querido" with music by Carlos Gardel and lyrics by Alfredo Le Pera.

Main cast
Ada Cornaro
Totón Podestá
Peter Warne
Rodolfo Vismara

External links

1936 films
Argentine musical drama films
1930s Spanish-language films
Argentine black-and-white films
1930s musical drama films
Tango films
Films directed by Julio Irigoyen
Films shot in Buenos Aires
Films set in Buenos Aires
1930s dance films
Argentine dance films
1936 drama films
1930s Argentine films